The current national emblem of Sudan was adopted in 1985.

Design
Because this national symbol follows the rules of heraldry it could be considered a national coat of arms instead of a national emblem.

It shows a secretary bird bearing a shield (escutcheon) from the time of Muhammad Ahmad, the self-proclaimed Mahdi who briefly ruled Sudan in the 19th century.

Two scrolls are placed on the arms; the upper one displays the national motto, An-nasr lanā النصر لنا ("Victory is ours"), and the lower one displays the title of the state, جمهورية السودان Jumhūriyat as-Sūdān ("Republic of the Sudan").

The coat of arms is also the Presidential seal and is found in gold on the flag of the President of Sudan and on the vehicles carrying the President and at his residence.

The secretary bird was chosen as a distinctively Sudanese and indigenous variant of the "Eagle of Saladin" and "Hawk of Quraish" seen in the emblems of some Arab states, and associated with Arab nationalism (see Coat of arms of Egypt, etc.).

History
During the period of Anglo-Egyptian condominium, the British Governor General of Sudan used an emblem that contained the words "GOVERNOR GENERAL OF THE SUDAN" surrounded by a laurel wreath.

Upon independence in 1956 ,the Republic of Sudan adopted an emblem depicting a rhinoceros enclosed by two palm-trees and olive branches, with the name of the state, جمهورية السودان Jumhūriyat as-Sūdān ("Republic of the Sudan"), displayed below. This emblem was used until 1970.

Sub-national emblems
Sudan is divided into 18 states and one area with special administrative status. Each state has adopted a distinct emblem for government use.

States

Administrative areas

Regions

Municipalities

See also 
 Flag of Sudan
Coat of arms of Iraq
Coat of arms of Palestine
Coat of arms of Syria
Coat of arms of Egypt
Coat of arms of Libya
Coat of arms of Yemen
 Emblem of Southern Sudan
Coat of arms of South Africa

References

Sudan
National symbols of Sudan
Sudan
Sudan